Adam David Rutherford (born 1975) is a British geneticist and science populariser. He was an audio-visual content editor for the journal Nature for a decade, and is a frequent contributor to the newspaper The Guardian. He hosts the BBC Radio 4 programmes Inside Science and (with Hannah Fry) The Curious Cases of Rutherford and Fry; has produced several science documentaries; and has published books related to genetics and the origin of life.

He is an honorary senior research associate in the division of biosciences at University College London.

Rutherford became President of Humanists UK in June 2022 succeeding former President, Alice Roberts.

Early life and education
Rutherford, who is half-Guyanese Indian, was born in Ipswich in the East of England and attended Ipswich School.

He was admitted to the medical school at University College London, but transferred to a degree in evolutionary genetics, including a project under Steve Jones studying stalk-eyed flies. He was awarded a PhD in genetics in 2002 by University College London for research completed at the UCL Institute of Child Health at Great Ormond Street Hospital supervised by Jane Sowden. His PhD investigated the role of the gene CHX10 on eye development, with focus on the effect of mutations in this gene on the development of eye disorders.

Rutherford's other academic research was also on genetic causes of eye disorders, including the relation of retinoschisin to retinoschisis, the role of mutations of the gene CRX in retinal dystrophy, and the role of the gene CHX10 in microphthalmia in humans and mice.

Career

Rutherford published a book on the topic of the creation of life. The United Kingdom printing has been called "two books in one", since Creation: The Origin of Life and Creation: The Future of Life are printed back-to-back so that one can read the book from either end. Among its topics, the first part of the book argues in support of the theory, first proposed by Thomas Gold, that life emerged not in primordial warm ponds, but in extremophile conditions in the deep ocean, while the second part discusses synthetic biology – the use of genetic modification to create new organisms. In the U.S., this book is published in a more conventional format with the title Creation: How Science Is Reinventing Life Itself.  He was also one of the authors whose works are included in the compilation The Atheist's Guide to Christmas.

Rutherford was the Podcast Editor and the audio-video editor for the journal Nature until 2013, being responsible for all the publication's published audio, video, and podcasts. He also published audio interviews with notable personalities, including Paul Bettany on his role playing Charles Darwin in the movie Creation, and David Attenborough in his documentary Charles Darwin and the Tree of Life.  He wrote editorials on other diverse topics ranging from the overlap of Art and Science to reviews of science-themed movies.

Rutherford is a frequent contributor to The Guardian, writing primarily on science topics. He wrote a blog series covering his thoughts and analysis while re-reading Charles Darwin's On the Origin of Species, and has written articles supporting the teaching of evolution in schools, and criticizing the teaching of creationism as science.

He also writes on religion, notably a 10-part series on his experience participating in the Alpha course, and on New Age themes and alternative medicine, including a review critical of Rupert Sheldrake's A New Science of Life, and criticism of the lack of controls on advertising claims for homeopathy.

As a guest writer, he published an article in Wired on the possibility of using DNA for information storage.

Rutherford has returned to University College London, where he is an honorary senior research associate in the division of biosciences and teaches courses on genetics and communications.

Broadcasting
Rutherford frequently appears on BBC science programmes, on both radio and television. Since 2013, he has been the host of the programme Inside Science on BBC Radio 4. In 2012 he was featured on the series Horizon on BBC Two television in the documentary Playing God, which covered synthetic biology using the example of the "Spider Goat", a goat genetically modified to produce spider silk in its milk.

In 2011 he presented, on BBC Four, The Gene Code, a two-part series on the implications of the decoding of the human genome, and his documentary, Science Betrayed, detailed the story of the discredited link between the MMR vaccine and autism. In 2010, The Cell, his three-part series on the discovery of cells and the development of cell biology, presented on BBC Four, was included in The Daily Telegraphs list of "10 classic science programmes". In 2006, Discovery Science produced the six-episode TV series Men in White, in which three scientists, Rutherford, Basil Singer and Jem Stansfield, applied science to the solution of everyday problems.

He also appeared in BBC Radio 4's The Infinite Monkey Cage, with physicist Brian Cox, physician and science writer Ben Goldacre, author Simon Singh, musician Tim Minchin, and comedians Helen Arney and Robin Ince, and with The Infinite Monkey Cage Tour, the live show based on the programme.
Rutherford is a frequent guest on the Little Atoms radio chat show, and he has also acted as a science advisor on programmes such as The Cat in the Hat Knows a Lot About That!, and the film World War Z.

In 2011 he conceived and directed Space Shuttles United, a video and musical tribute to all the Space Shuttle missions.

He co-presents The Curious Cases of Rutherford & Fry with mathematician Hannah Fry.  the programme is airing its 19th series on BBC Radio 4.

In late 2022, he presented the series Bad Blood: The Story of Eugenics, on BBC Radio 4. The series is based on his book, Control: The Dark History and Troubling Present of Eugenics.

Public speaking and outreach

Rutherford is a frequent speaker at scientific and academic events and a guest at local science and sceptical events, such as Skeptics in the Pub.

In 2013, he was an invited speaker at the QED conference in Manchester, and at the 2013 North East Postgraduate Conference, and delivered the 11th Douglas Adams Memorial Lecture at the Royal Geographical Society in London for Save the Rhino International. In 2012, he delivered the annual Darwin Day Lecture for Humanists UK. In 2019, he delivered the Humanists UK Voltaire Lecture; the lecture formed the basis of his future book How to Argue With a Racist.

Rutherford was a judge and host of the award ceremonies for the 2012 and 2013 Google Science Fairs.
In June 2017, Rutherford participated in a public discussion with Alan Alda at the University of Dundee, on the occasion of Alda's receiving an honorary degree from that institution. In November 2017, he participated in a debate with Robert Winston on the subject of superhumans at the University of Southampton.

Books
Creation: The Origin of Life / The Future of Life, Penguin Books (2014), 
A Brief History of Everyone Who Ever Lived: The Stories in Our Genes, Weidenfeld & Nicolson (2016),  – UK edition
A Brief History of Everyone Who Ever Lived: The Human Story Retold Through Our Genes, The Experiment (2017),  – updated US edition
Genetics (illus. Ruth Palmer), Ladybird Books (2018), 
The Book of Humans: The Story of How We Became Us, Weidenfeld & Nicolson (2018), 
Humanimal: How Homo sapiens Became Nature’s Most Paradoxical Creature—A New Evolutionary History, The Experiment (2019), 
How to Argue with a Racist: History, Science, Race and Reality (2020) 
Control: The Dark History and Troubling Present of Eugenics (2022)

Awards and honours
 2014 Wellcome Book Prize shortlist for Creation: The Origin of Life
 2017 Wellcome Book Prize longlist for A Brief History of Everyone Who Ever Lived

Personal life
Rutherford is a founding member of the Celeriac XI Cricket club.

References

1970s births
British atheists
British humanists
British geneticists
British television presenters
British people of Indo-Guyanese descent
Critics of creationism
Living people
People educated at Ipswich School
Scientists from Ipswich
Synthetic biologists
British science journalists
BBC Radio 4 presenters
Year of birth missing (living people)